Incident in Shanghai is a 1938 British drama film directed by John Paddy Carstairs and starring Margaret Vyner, Patrick Barr, Ralph Roberts and Derek Gorst. It was made at Pinewood Studios as a quota quickie for release by Paramount Pictures. It was shot in eleven days on a budget of £7,000.

It was considered to have topical interest for audiences due to the ongoing Second Sino-Japanese War.

Plot
In Shanghai, Madeleine Linden is an unhappy wife who falls in love with wounded pilot Pat Avon, upon whom her husband Brian, the head of the Red Cross, must operate.

Cast
 Margaret Vyner as Madeleine Linden
 Patrick Barr as Pat Avon
 Ralph Roberts as Robert Barlow
 Derek Gorst as Brian Linden
 John Deverell as Weepie
 George Courtney as Mel Purdue
 Lotus Fragrance as Butterfly Ku
 Rita Davies as Ada Newell

Critical reception
TV Guide called it a "...plodding romantic drama."

References

Bibliography
 Chibnall, Steve. Quota Quickies: The Birth of the British 'B' Film. British Film Institute, 2007.

External links

1938 films
1938 drama films
Films directed by John Paddy Carstairs
Films with screenplays by John Paddy Carstairs
Films shot at Pinewood Studios
British drama films
Films produced by Anthony Havelock-Allan
Films set in Shanghai
Quota quickies
British black-and-white films
British and Dominions Studios films
Adultery in films
1930s English-language films
1930s British films